LCR may refer to:

Science and technology
 LCR circuit, an inductor, capacitor and resistor electrical circuit
 LCR meter, for measuring inductance, capacitance and resistance 
 Least-cost routing, the process of selecting the path of outbound communications traffic based on cost
 Left/Center/Right, a speaker designation type used in surround sound
 Line Concentration Ratio, in telephony; see Number Five Crossbar Switching System
 Low Chip Rate, one of the two transmission modes of UMTS-TDD 3G standard

Molecular biology
 Leucocyanidin reductase, an enzyme in the leucocyanidin biosynthesis pathway
 Ligase chain reaction, a method for DNA amplification similar to the polymerase chain reaction
 Locus control region, in epigenetics
 Low copy repeats, in molecular genetics

Organizations
 Lake County Railroad, a railroad company based in Lakeview, Oregon, US
 LifeWay Christian Resources, a Christian publisher in Nashville, TN, US
 Revolutionary Communist League (France), a former political party in France
 Revolutionary Communist League (Belgium), a political party in Belgium
 Lutheran Churches of the Reformation
 Log Cabin Republicans, an LGBT organization that supports the US Republican Party
 London and Continental Railways, a property development company owned by the UK Government, originally established to build the Channel Tunnel Rail Link
 Louis Christen Racing, a company that manufactures sidecar road racing chassis
 LCR Team, a motorcycle team currently competing in MotoGP

Other uses
 Landing Craft Rubber, an inflatable rubber boat used to carry troops
 Lead and Copper Rule, a regulation issued under the US Safe Drinking Water Act
 Liquidity Coverage Ratio, a global minimum liquidity standard that is part of Basel III
 Liverpool City Region, a region of northwest England
 Loughborough Campus Radio
 Ruger LCR, a revolver made by the Ruger company
 Boten–Vientiane railway, formally known as Laos-China Railway

See also
 Landing Craft Rubber Large (CRL or LCR (L))